Christopher Ballew (born May 28, 1965) is an American musician best known as the lead singer and bassist of the alternative rock group the Presidents of the United States of America. He also performs and records as a children's artist under the pseudonym Caspar Babypants.

Biography
Ballew grew up in Seattle and attended middle and high school at Bush School, where he met Dave Dederer, with whom he would later form the Presidents of the United States of America. In the late 1980s and early '90s, Ballew lived in Boston, where he performed as a street musician in a duo called Egg with Phil Franklin (later of Caroliner Rainbow and Sunburned Hand of the Man). Many of Ballew's songs with Egg would become well-known Presidents songs, most notably "Naked and Famous", which is performed by Egg as a bonus track on a 2005 reissue of the Presidents' eponymous debut album. The two members of Egg were also part of the experimental triple-bass guitar ensemble Balls, which released a 12-inch EP in 1991.  While in Boston, Ballew also played briefly with Mary Lou Lord, and with Mark Sandman of Treat Her Right and Morphine, in a duo called Supergroup, in which they developed the oddly-stringed instruments that would become a staple of both the Presidents' and Morphine's sound.

Ballew moved to Los Angeles in the early 1990s, where he shared an apartment with musician Beck and played in his live band. Ballew told Seattle Weekly that playing with Beck "was the beginning of my professional career as a guy getting paid to make music." He returned to his native Washington in 1993 and started the Presidents of the United States of America. The band released six studio albums, then split up in July 2015.

In 1998, Ballew released a solo album credited to the Giraffes. The recording project turned into a band between 1999 and 2000. For the live version of the Giraffes, Ballew was joined by Jason Staczek (organ, clarinet) and Mike Musburger (drums).

In 2009, Ballew launched a project targeted toward toddlers, called Caspar Babypants. Ballew uses a three-string acoustic guitar when performing Caspar Babypants songs. To date, Caspar Babypants has released seventeen full-length albums, all with exclamatory titles such as "Here I Am!", "More Please!", "This Is Fun!", "Sing Along!'", "Hot Dog!", "I Found You!", "Baby Beatles!", "Rise and Shine!", "Night Night!", "Beatles Baby!", "Away We Go!", "Winter Party!", "Jump for Joy!", "Keep It Real!", "Flying High!", "Bug Out!", and "Happy Heart!" Ballew released the nineteenth Caspar Babypants album, "Easy Breezy!", on November 5, 2021.

In 2015, fifteen years after the last official release, Chris Ballew put together We Hear Music, a 33-track double album consisting of previously unreleased Giraffes material. The record was shared privately with a few fans through the internet, with a note allowing the recipients to redistribute the music freely.

Ballew also publishes as a solo artist under his own name. His first album, I Am Not Me, came out in July 2021. In 2022, he released two albums, Soul Unfolded and Primitive God.

In June 2022, he performed "Peaches" with "Weird Al" Yankovic.

Equipment
During his time with the Presidents, Ballew was endorsed by Epiphone Guitars and Orange amplifiers, utilizing an Epiphone SG-400 guitar (converted into a two-string "basitar"), as well as an AD200B MK 3 200-Watt Bass Head from Orange. No distortion pedals are used live; just the natural distortion of the amp is heard. Regarding his two-string "basitar", Ballew admits: "I'm technically not really a bass player, although, I play as if I'm playing bass lines, a lot of times I strum like (on a) guitar and make chords."

Personal life
Ballew is married to collage artist Kate Endle.

Discography
With the Presidents of the United States of America
 The Presidents of the United States of America (1995, Sony)
 II (1996, Sony)
 Rarities (1997, Import)
 Pure Frosting (1998, Sony)
 Lump (2000, Sony Special Product)
 Freaked Out and Small (2000, Music Blitz)
 Love Everybody (2004, PUSA Inc)
 These Are the Good Times People (2008, PUSA Inc)
 Kudos to You! (2014, PUSA Inc)

With Balls
 We Will Grow on You (1990, Elaterium Records) – only 300 LPs printed

With Egg
 "Emotional Cowboy" on the compilation EP A Kinder, Gentler Genocide (Wasted Effort Records, 1990)

As Caspar
 Lint Cake (1991, Raw Poo Music)
 Sonic Uke (1993, Raw Poo Music)
 Caspar (1996, Raw Poo Music)

With Caspar and Mollusk (aka Chris & Beck)
 Caspar and Mollusk (1995, Cosmic Records)

With Supergroup (aka Chris & Mark Sandman)
 Supergroup (1995, Cosmic Records, 45 rpm single)

With the Minus 5
 The Lonesome Death of Buck McCoy (1997)

With the Giraffes
 13 Other Dimensions (1998, My Own Planet)
 The Days Are Filled with Years (2000, Orange Recordings)
 Zero Friction (2000)
 We Hear Music (2015)

With the Tycoons
 Is It Christmas Yet? (1998, Collective Fruit)

With Chris and Tad
 Hand Me That Door (2000, Orange Recordings)

With Subset (aka PUSA & Sir Mix-a-Lot)
 Addicted to the Fame (2000, MusicBlitz.com)

With Chris Ballew and Friends
 Program for Early Parent Support (PEPS): Sing with a Child (2002)

With Creepy Stick
 Creepy Stick (2005)

With the Feelings Hijackers
 T.F.H. (2005)
 Skeletal Remains (2007)

As Caspar Babypants
 Here I Am! (2009)
 More Please! (2009)
 PEPS Sing a Long! (2010) (Download only)
 This Is Fun! (2010)
 Sing Along! (2011)
 Hot Dog! (2012)
 I Found You! (2012)
 Baby Beatles (2013)
 Rise and Shine! (2014)
 Night Night! (2015)
 Beatles Baby! (2015)
 Away We Go! (2016)
 Winter Party! (2016)
 Jump for Joy! (2017)
 Sleep Tight! (2018)
 Fun Favorites! (2018)
 Keep It Real! (2018)
 Flying High! (2019)
 Bug Out! (2020)
 Happy Heart! (2020)
 Easy Breezy! (2021)

Solo
 My First Computer (2003)
 Like to Boogie (2004)
 "Run World, Run" (2005) (A soundtrack to a short Flash advertisement for Brooks Running)
 I Am Not Me (2021)
 Soul Unfolded (2022)
 Primitive God (2022)
 Bone by Bone (2023)

References

External links

 
 The Presidents of the United States of America official website (archived)
 Caspar Babypants official website
 Chris Ballew: Post-grunge, children's music, and the untold story of Sampladelic Project Revolver, May 17, 2017

1965 births
20th-century American guitarists
20th-century American male musicians
21st-century American guitarists
Living people
Musicians from Seattle
American rock guitarists
American male guitarists
The Presidents of the United States of America (band) members
The Minus 5 members